Thomas Francis Eccleston (25 September 1875 – 1946) was an English footballer who played in the Football League for Preston North End.

References

1872 births
1949 deaths
English footballers
Association football midfielders
English Football League players
Preston North End F.C. players
Reading F.C. players